Paignton Rugby Football Club is a rugby union club, originally formed in 1875 and based in Paignton, Devon. They moved to Queens Park in 1902 and have played there ever since. Paignton Rugby Club is affiliated to the Devon RFU and currently compete in Cornwall/Devon - a league at level 8 of the English rugby union system - following their relegation from Western Counties West at the end of the 2018–19 season.  Many of the club's players have represented the club at county or national level. The club have won the Cornwall/Devon League on three occasions; more than any other club.  They have a friendly rivalry with neighbours Torquay Athletic RFC.

History

The first Paignton club was formed in 1875. It consisted of gentlemen from Paignton and Torquay and played on Paignton Green. After two successful seasons, the Torquay members left to form a separate “Torquay and South Devon” club. 
 Paignton were one of the first members of the Devon Rugby Football Union, and an earlier incarnation of the modern club, the Paignton Scarlet Runners, were the first ever winners of the Devon Junior Cup in 1889. The club, now based at the Cycle Track behind the Esplanade Hotel, subsequently took senior status but folded within a year. This led to Torquay Atletic being lured from the Recreation Ground to Paignton Cycle Track for the 1890/91 season. At the end of the season, Tics returned to the Rec and a new Paignton club was formed. Paignton went on to win the Junior Cup again in 1900.  Several years later Paignton were promoted to the Devon Senior Cup and made the final for the first time in 1904, only to lose to Plymouth.  The club would have to wait until the late 1920s for their next success, when a reserve side won the Junior Cup in 1927, followed by a first ever Senior Cup victory in 1931 when they defeated Sidmouth 6-0.  After the Second World War the club failed to match the exploits of the 1930s, with the Havill Plate success in 1974 being the only county silverware of note.

With the advent of the leagues in 1987, Paignton were placed in Cornwall/Devon at level 8 of the English rugby union system.  A season later they were relegated into Devon 1 where they spent three seasons, also winning the Devon Junior Cup during that time.  Promotion back to Cornwall/Devon in 1993 saw the club rise up the league system and they were in South West 2 by 1995. They spent five seasons at tier 7 (renamed to Western Counties West) until they were relegated at the end of 2000–01 season, their campaign not help by an outbreak of foot and mouth disease which meant a number of games went unplayed.  The club were not gone for long as they made a speedy return by winning Cornwall/Devon the following year.

Despite a further relegation in 2006, the club started to enter a period of success with two quick-fire promotions in 2007 and 2008 to book their place in South West 2 West, which at tier 6 was the highest level the club had reached in its league history.  They also started to become one of the more competitive sides in the county, reaching the Devon Senior Cup final in 2007 (losing to rivals Torquay) and winning the Devon Senior Plate in 2010.  The next decade was not quite as successful as the club dropped two divisions following relegations in 2013 and 2014, although another promotion (as runners up in Cornwall/Devon) at the end of the 2016–17 season has seen Paignton stabilise in Western Counties West.

At the end of the 2018-19 season, Paignton finished bottom on Western Counties West and were relegated to level 8 (Tribute Cornwall/Devon).

Ground

Queens Park is situated in the heart of Paignton, just off Queens Road, near to the sea and less than 5 minutes walk from the train station.  The ground was built in 1900 on what was formerly marshy land and is shared by both Paignton Rugby Football Club and Paignton Cricket Club, with rugby taking place in the autumn and spring, and cricket in the summer months.  Parking is available at the ground.

At the entrance of the ground there is the Victorian era club-house, with the grandstand on top, and there are two rugby pitches - one for senior matches, the other for juniors, with small covered areas adjacent to the senior pitch. In the summer this area is then combined to host cricket fixtures.  Originally there was just one rugby pitch horizontal to the club-house/grandstand, but due to damage caused to the cricket wicket it was decided to instead split the area into two pitches, with the wicket in between.  The grandstand has seating capacity for around 150, while the main rugby pitch has standing capacity for approximately 1,500 supporters, bringing the total capacity to 1,650.  When cricket is played the capacity increases to around 3,000.

Teams 
The club has several teams in its senior and youth sections.  There are male and female teams ranging from under-6 teams to under-16 teams in the youth section and the senior teams being the 1st XV, 2nd XV, 3rd XV (affectionately knowns as the "Rams") and a ladies team.

Season summary

Honours
Devon Junior Cup winners (4): 1889, 1900, 1927 (reserve team), 1992
Devon Senior Cup winners: 1931
Havill Plate winners: 1974
Cornwall & Devon champions (3): 1994–95, 2001–02, 2006–07
Tribute Western Counties West champions: 2007-08
Devon Senior Plate winners: 2010

Devon Senior Cup record 
 1906 (lost) 12 – 4 in the final against Plymouth.
 1931 (won), 6 – 0 in final against Sidmouth
 2007 runner-up in a final against Torquay
 2008 semi-final
Source - Devon RFU Handbook 2005/2006

Notes

See also
Devon RFU

References

Data obtained from club, Devon cup data obtained from Match day programme for the 2007 Devon cup final.

External links
 Official Club Website

English rugby union teams
Rugby clubs established in 1873
Rugby union in Devon
Paignton